Ituzaingó is the capital of the Ituzaingó Partido in the Greater Buenos Aires metropolitan area, Argentina, west of Buenos Aires.

Overview

Ituzaingó has been the capital of the Ituzaingó Partido or municipality of Buenos Aires Province since 1995, when the partido was created. Buildings of more than three stories were until recently prohibited and most houses are only one story high

The shopping area near the train station connecting the city with Buenos Aires City (Downtown) is located surrounding a square, opposite the church, where concerts, cultural events and fares are held on weekends and holidays.

It has  French-style chalets, quiet streets and leafy trees, which coexist in all neighborhoods of the city. According to the last national census of 2010, the population was of 168,419 people.

It stands out the neighborhood of Parque Leloir, one of the largest protected ecological zones of the Province, and also known to be a quiet residential neighborhood with huge houses and home of many celebrities.

Sport
Club Atlético Ituzaingó is the local professional team.

Notable people
 Ceferino Denis (born 1978), footballer
 Tomás Lanzini (born 1988), footballer
 Ricardo Passano (1922-2012), actor
 Nicolás Peranic (born 1985), footballer
 Fernando Caldeiro (1958-2009), Argentine-American NASA astronaut
 Moria Casán (born 1946), actress, producer, TV & theater personality

References

 Municipality of Ituzaingó
 
 La Voz De Ituzaingó - Local newspaper.
   The Battle of Ituzaingó - History of the battle from which the city takes its name.

 
Populated places in Buenos Aires Province
Argentina
Cities in Argentina